Brendan Kennedy (born 7 December 1974, in Dublin) is an Irish former footballer.

Kennedy is the brother of Mark Kennedy - the ex-Irish international and ex-Liverpool player. He is a goalkeeper who played for junior clubs such as Cherry Orchard, Ashtown Villa, and Moyle Park before entering the League of Ireland with Shamrock Rovers in the 1993–94 season. He made one appearance as a substitute for 4 minutes for Rovers in the League of Ireland on 15 August 1993.

He played for Dublin City from 2002 to 2004. Kennedy won the League of Ireland First Division championship with City in 2003 but was abruptly discarded by newly installed manager Roddy Collins in the late summer of 2004, whereupon he joined Kildare County, making 11 first-team appearances during the season.

He rejoined Dublin City in 2005, but appeared only sporadically in the latter part of the season, James Gallagher, on loan from Finn Harps, being Dermot Keely's preferred goalkeeper. Kennedy was, however, recalled for the promotion/relegation play-off in which City beat Shamrock Rovers to once more gain admission to the Premier Division. Despite this, Kennedy was not offered a new contract at the end of the 2005 season.

His stint at Kildare County began in December. He was a consistent goalkeeper throughout the season.  His performances included a penalty save against Limerick in a league match in September.

Towards the end of the 2006 season Kennedy struggled to hold on to his place due to competition with the promising new keeper John Flynn. He was released from Kildare County at the end of the 2006 season. He was not signed by any League of Ireland club for the 2007 season but signed for Monaghan United for the 2008 season.

Kennedy is now manager of Dunboyne A.F.C. in the Leinster Senior League.

Honours
Dublin City
 League of Ireland First Division:  2003

References

1974 births
Living people
Association footballers from County Dublin
Republic of Ireland association footballers
Association football goalkeepers
League of Ireland players
Shamrock Rovers F.C. players
Kildare County F.C. players
Dublin City F.C. players
Monaghan United F.C. players
Cherry Orchard F.C. players